Mustang is a 2015 Turkish-language drama film co-written and directed by Deniz Gamze Ergüven in her feature debut. Set in a remote Turkish village, Mustang depicts the lives of five young orphaned sisters and the challenges they face growing up as girls in a conservative society. The event that triggers the family backlash against the five sisters at the beginning of the film is based on Ergüven's personal life. Mustang is an international co-production of France, Germany and Turkey.

It premiered at the Directors' Fortnight section of the 2015 Cannes Film Festival, where it won the Europa Cinemas Label Award. Mustang was selected as France's submission and was nominated for the Best Foreign Language Film at the 88th Academy Awards. It received nine nominations at the 41st César Awards and won four, for First Feature Film, Original Screenplay, Editing and Original Music. Mustang has received widespread critical praise.

Plot
The film starts with Lale, the youngest of the five sisters and the protagonist, bidding an emotional farewell at school to her female teacher, who is moving to Istanbul. The sisters decide to walk home instead of taking a van, to enjoy the sunny day. Along the way, they play in the water at the beach with their classmates. For one game, they sit on boys' shoulders and try to knock each other off. When they reach home, their grandmother scolds and hits them for their having this kind of bodily contact with boys and thus "pleasuring themselves" with them. Their uncle Erol is equally furious. From then on, the girls are forbidden from leaving the house, even for school.

The sisters feel stifled in their home as their grandmother tries to make them suitable for marriage. When in public they must now dress in drab, conservative clothing. Instead of attending school, they must stay home, where they are taught how to cook, clean and sew by their female relatives. Even so, the oldest sister, Sonay, sneaks out occasionally to meet her lover, and Lale looks for various ways to escape.

Lale, who loves football, is forbidden from attending Trabzonspor matches. She resolves to go to a match from which men have been banned due to hooliganism. A friend tells her that the girls in the village are going together on a bus. The sisters, who are happy for an opportunity to leave the house, sneak out of the house with Lale. When they miss the bus, they hitch a ride with a passing truck driver, Yasin, who helps them catch up to it. They’re ecstatic in the exuberant atmosphere of the all-female crowd cheering for their team. Back home, their aunt catches a glimpse of them at the match on TV, just as their uncle and other village men are about to tune in. To prevent the men from finding out, she cuts the house's, and then the whole village's, electricity.

When the girls return, their grandmother decides to start marrying the sisters off. They’re taken to town, ostensibly "to get lemonade", which is actually an opportunity to show them off to potential suitors. Soon enough, a suitor and his family arrive to meet them. Sonay vows to only marry her lover and refuses to meet the prospective suitor and his family. Selma is sent instead and becomes engaged. Sonay gets engaged a short while later to her lover. At the two sisters' joint wedding, Sonay is clearly happy while Selma is not. On the night of her wedding, Selma's in-laws come to view the bed sheets in a traditional ritual to establish that Selma was a virgin before her wedding night. Because there is no blood on the sheet, her in-laws take her to a physician to have her virginity tested.

Next in line for marriage is Ece. It’s revealed that her uncle is sexually abusing her at night. In Lale’s words, she starts acting “dangerously.” When the three remaining girls stop with their uncle near a bank, Ece allows a boy to have sexual contact with her in their car. She makes jokes at the lunch table, inciting loud laughs from her sisters, and is told to go to her room, where she shoots herself and dies. The surviving sisters and their family attend the funeral.

Now it is just the two youngest sisters, Nur and Lale, at home. Lale continues sneaking out. On one impulsive attempt to walk to Istanbul alone she is encountered by Yasin, the truck driver, who is kind to her. At Lale's request, he later teaches her how to drive. When she is caught on the way back into her house, the house is again reinforced to try to make it impossible for them to leave.

It becomes evident that the uncle starts abusing Nur and that their grandmother knows about it. She says that now it is time for her to be married off. Though she is young, she is found a suitor and engaged to be married. On the night of Nur's wedding, Lale convinces her to resist, and the girls bar themselves inside the house while the whole wedding party is outside, much to the embarrassment of their family. As the wedding party disperses, their uncle violently tries to get inside. Lale finds the phone hidden in a cupboard and plugs it in to call Yasin for help. The girls gather up money and a few supplies, grab the uncle's car keys, and sneak out of the house. They manage to escape in the car, crashing it close to their house. They hide and wait for Yasin, who picks them up and takes them to the local bus station. The girls take the bus to Istanbul, where they find their former teacher, who greets them warmly.

Cast
 Güneş Şensoy as Lale 
 Doğa Doğuşlu as Nur 
 Elit İşcan as Ece
 Tuğba Sunguroğlu as Selma 
 İlayda Akdoğan as Sonay
 Nihal Koldaş as the grandmother
 Ayberk Pekcan as Erol
 Erol Afşin as Osman

Production
After graduating from La Fémis film school in 2006, Ergüven was initially developing a film about the 1992 Los Angeles riots, which would later be made and released as Kings in 2017. In 2011, she was invited to the Cinéfondation workshop at the Cannes Film Festival to pitch the project, where she met Alice Winocour, who was pitching her film, Augustine. She subsequently put Kings on hold and wrote Mustang with Winocour over the summer of 2012. The event of girls being reprimanded for sitting on boys' shoulders depicted earlier in the film was based on Ergüven's own experience as a teenager.

Of the five girls who played the main sisters, only Elit İşcan had acted before. Ergüven wrote her role, Ece, with İşcan in mind. Tuğba Sunguroğlu was discovered and recruited by Ergüven at the baggage claim of Charles de Gaulle Airport after a flight from Istanbul to Paris. The other three, Güneş Şensoy, Doğa Doğuşlu, and İlayda Akdoğan, were cast through audition among hundreds.

The film was a co-production between France, Germany, and Turkey, with a budget of €1.4 million. Weeks before shooting was scheduled to begin, a leading French producer pulled out of the film. She cited a shortage of funds as the main reason, and, among other things, Ergüven's pregnancy, which Ergüven had discovered a week before. A few days later, Charles Gillibert came on board as producer.

The film was shot in and around the Black Sea coastal town of İnebolu, 600 kilometers from Istanbul. The football scene was acted at an actual match where no adult men were allowed to attend. The filmmakers were denied filming the match at the last minute, so they used images from the station which televised the match, which was informed of the situation.

The film's score was Warren Ellis's first to compose by himself. Ergüven approached Ellis, who initially turned it down due to a busy schedule, but was eventually persuaded.

Release
Mustang premiered at the Directors' Fortnight section of the 2015 Cannes Film Festival on 19 May 2015. In France, it was released on 17 June 2015 and had 505,223 admissions. In Turkey, it was released on 23 October 2015 and had 25,419 admissions. It was selected to be screened in the Special Presentations section of the 2015 Toronto International Film Festival.

Reception
Mustang has received widespread acclaim from critics. On Rotten Tomatoes, the film has a rating of 97%, based on 149 reviews, with an average rating of 8.14/10. The site's critical consensus reads, "Mustang delivers a bracing — and thoroughly timely — message whose power is further bolstered by the efforts of a stellar ensemble cast." Metacritic reports a score of 83 out of 100, based on 29 reviews, indicating "universal acclaim".

For Variety, Jay Weissberg compared it to The Virgin Suicides and criticized the narration as redundant while praising the direction of performances. IndieWire critic Jessica Kiang gave it a B, as "less a cultural critique, and more a bittersweet, often angry lament for childhoods ended before childhood has actually ended". Screen Dailys Tim Grierson found difficulty distinguishing between the sister characters but enjoyed their unity. Richard Brody wrote that Ergüven "gets appealing and fiercely committed performances from the five young actresses at the story’s center, but above all she effectively stokes righteous anger at a situation that admits no clear remedy other than mere escape". In The Daily Telegraph, Tristram Fane Saunders awarded it four stars and identified its voice as "fierce, confident and rebellious". The Guardians Wendy Ide gave it five stars, citing it for "rebellious spirit". Ty Burr called it "an excellent first film" that condemns the treatment of women in Anatolia villages.

In Turkey, the reaction to Mustang was polarized. While critics such as Atilla Dorsay praised the film, it was criticized as depicting Turkish culture in inaccurate or orientalist ways.

Accolades

See also
 List of submissions to the 88th Academy Awards for Best Foreign Language Film
 List of French submissions for the Academy Award for Best Foreign Language Film

References

External links
 
 Mustang on Facebook (US)

2015 films
2015 drama films
2015 directorial debut films
2010s coming-of-age drama films
2010s feminist films
2010s Turkish-language films
Films about gender
Films scored by Warren Ellis (musician)
French coming-of-age drama films
Turkish drama films
German coming-of-age drama films
Best Film Lumières Award winners
European Film Awards winners (films)
Best First Feature Film César Award winners
Films about sisters
Films about puberty
2010s French films
2010s German films